Aaron Anthony Swinson (born January 9, 1971) is an American retired professional basketball player. A 6'5" (1.96 m) forward, Swinson played college basketball at Auburn University.

In 1994-95, Swinson played in nine games for the Phoenix Suns of the National Basketball Association (NBA).

Trophies

With Yakima Sun Kings
CBA: (1) 1995

With Valencia BC
Copa del Rey: (1) 1998

External links
NBA stats @ basketballreference.com
Profile at Lega Basket
Profile at ACB.com

1971 births
Living people
African-American basketball players
American expatriate basketball people in Argentina
American expatriate basketball people in France
American expatriate basketball people in Italy
American expatriate basketball people in Spain
American men's basketball players
Auburn Tigers men's basketball players
Basketball players from Georgia (U.S. state)
Club Ourense Baloncesto players
Élan Béarnais players
Joventut Badalona players
Libertad de Sunchales basketball players
Liga ACB players
Montecatiniterme Basketball players
Northwestern State Lady Demons basketball coaches
People from Brunswick, Georgia
Phoenix Suns players
Roseto Sharks players
Small forwards
Undrafted National Basketball Association players
Valencia Basket players
Yakima Sun Kings players
21st-century African-American sportspeople
20th-century African-American sportspeople